Vitaly Alexandrovich Chekhover (also spelled Tschechower or Czechower, pronounced "chekh a VYAIR") (December 22, 1908 – February 11, 1965) was a Soviet chess player and chess composer. He was also a pianist.

Composing career 

 
In the beginning of his career as an endgame study composer, Chekhover often revised traditional studies of other authors. He strove to bring them into a more sparse and economical form, often with fewer pieces – hence focusing on the actual problem itself, rather than the position on the board. Later he found his own style and composed a number of original, independent chess studies and problems. Starting 1936, Chekhover published more than 160 endgame studies. He is considered a prominent specialist on knight endgames, and has written several books on the subject; either alone, or with coauthors such as Russian grandmaster Yuri Averbakh.

Between 1947 and 1965 he participated in the Soviet Union championship for chess composition. Chekhover twice received the title Master of Sports of the USSR. In 1956 he was awarded the title International Judge of Chess Compositions by FIDE, and received the FIDE title International Master of Chess Compositions in 1961.

Playing career
Chekover was also a very successful chess player, being awarded the title of International Master in 1950 when the title was first introduced. Tournament victories include victory in the Leningrad City Chess Championship in 1937 (shared) and 1949. He won the Uzbekistani Chess Championship in 1944.

A variation of the Sicilian Defence is named after him: 1. e4 c5 2. Nf3 d6 3. d4 cxd4 4. Qxd4 (see Sicilian Defence, Chekhover Variation).

Bibliography

References

External links 

1908 births
1965 deaths
Sportspeople from Saint Petersburg
People from Sankt-Peterburgsky Uyezd
Chess International Masters
Chess composers
Soviet chess players
Soviet chess writers
Soviet male writers
Chess theoreticians
20th-century chess players